Sungbong Choi (born February 18, 1990) is a South Korean singer. After passing qualification examinations for elementary school and middle school, he graduated from the Dae-Jeon Art High School, and made his famous debut on the 2011 season of Korea's Got Talent. He was the first runner-up of the talent show.

Early life
Sungbong Choi was born in Seoul, and was abandoned at an orphanage when he was three. He ran away from the orphanage to escape physical abuse, took a bus to Daejeon, and started living in the red light districts. His approach to Jeong-So Park for a music lesson was a life-changing event. Park agreed to teach him for free and got him more support from the church and ChildFund Korea.

Education
After passing elementary school and middle school through qualification examinations, Choi graduated from Dae-Jeon Art High School, and went on to the Department of Cultural Art Management at Kyung-Hee Cyber University.

During his troubled youth, Choi claims he hid at a night school when he was 14 to escape area gang members. He learned how to read and write and applied for qualification examinations to pass elementary and middle school and enter high school. With hopes of learning music and spending his school years with friends, he entered Dae-Jeon Art High School.  To earn school tuition fee and private lesson fees, he worked at a delivery service, but he suffered a grave injury while working the night shift.
Choi seriously thought about dropping out of high school, and his music teacher testified that he was often absent because of the underprivileged surroundings. He gained admission to Hanyang University, but due to financial difficulties, was unable to pursue undergraduate education. Instead, he spent his days working as a day laborer.

Career

Korea's Got Talent
On 6 June 2011, Choi's performance of Ennio Morricone's "Nella Fantasia" on Korea's Got Talent moved judges and audience members to tears. He introduced himself as a manual laborer who had made a living selling gum and energy drinks for ten years.
All three judges, Kolleen Park, Jang Jin and Song Yun-ah, were impressed with his vocal talent. Choi advanced to the finals of the competition, finishing second by only 280 votes.

YouTube sensation

Choi's performance clip was posted to YouTube and triggered a worldwide Internet sensation, receiving praise from pop stars Justin Bieber, BoA, Jung-Hwa Um, several hundred thousand fans on Facebook and also political figures including South Korea's former president Lee-Myung-Park. One version with English subtitles has triggered international press interest  and a worldwide view that Choi was "the next Susan Boyle". The video itself has received over 168,201,756 views as of May 31, 2017, and the number is still rising.  As of September 24, 2020 the video has 175,078,474 views.

Controversy
On 4 June 2011, after his first appearance on the show, some people accused him of concealing the fact that he had graduated from art high school although he was rarely able to attend classes due to his financial situation and was said to have received his diploma out of pity.

The KGT production team explained that "It was cut from the film during editing. He stated that he'd graduated from art high school at the second local tryout, and the judges, crews and hundreds of audience members heard that." KGT later broadcast the re-edited version including the statement.

Entertainment

After his appearance on KGT, other major entertainment companies tried to persuade Choi to sign contracts with them and he signed up with Sony Music Korea Inc. but cancelled the contract in December 2011. He is currently with Bongbong Company.

Health issues 
Choi revealed in January 2021 that he was suffering from cancer and was fundraising money to support his latest album. On October 29, 2021, Choi admitted to faking his cancer illness. In an apology released to Korean media, Choi stated, "...I am not currently suffering from cancer and I admit that I am not suffering from colon, prostate, thyroid, lungs, brain, and heart cancer."

Music

Artistry – Crossover tenor

CNN commented that "His powerful baritone voice sounds as if it belongs to a man twice his age and build." He is currently experimenting with different genres, including Crossover. His vocal tone is soft and emotionally appealing, drawing on his life experiences.

Performances
 Invitation performance by South Korean President, Charity performances and speeches
 Invitation performance by Chairman of Cisco [San Diego, United States, April 2012]
 You Fest Main Final Concert (with Paul Potts) [Madrid, Spain, September 2012]
 Singing the Korean National Anthem at the inaugural ceremony of London Olympic [Seoul, July–August 2012]
 Conducting Chorus of Global Multicultural Festival [Seoul, May 2013]
 Halftime performance at Suwon International Olympic "Peace cup" [Suwon, July 2012]
 Teenager's Healing Concert by Ministry of Environment [Seoul, July 2012]
 Singing the South Korean national anthem at the National Assembly on Constitution Day (with the Millennium Symphony) [Seoul, July 2012]
 Andy – Live In Concert at the Greek Theatre [Los Angeles, United States, August 2012]
 Accompanied Performance with Seoul Philharmonic

Album
 Featuring Korea's Got Talent // Nella Fantasia, Cinema Paradiso [Sony Music] [2011]
 Featuring Popera Vocalist Park Jung So  Nella Fantasia // Nella Fantasia [2012]
 Featuring Popera Vocalist Park Jung So  Because He Lives // Amazing Grace [2012]

Essay
He said that he does not want to live his life shackled to his past and that he wrote the book in gratitude for the attention and love he has received, which has been of great comfort to him.

Broadcasting and interviews

Outline
Choi has appeared on music shows, documentary films and talk shows both in South Korea and overseas. He appeared with Justin Bieber on the Spanish TV programme El Hormiguero. CNN and ABC headlined the interview with him. Choi said that he wants to continue to overcome his experiences of the past 22 years. "It is a blessing that I can live my life without starving, being abused and freezing. I'll keep taking on challenges and trying my best."

TV shows and interviews
Korea's Got Talent season 1 [tvN, June 2011]
 Live Talk Show Taxi [tvN, September 2011]
 Back Ji-yeo'’s People inside [tvN, September 2011]
 Documentary Film Rebel of 3 color talent [tvN, September 2011]
 Story on Kind Ms. Mi-sun [tvN, November 2011]
 Opera star 2012 [tvN, February 2012]
 Morning Garden [KBS1, May 2012]
 El Hormiguero [Antena3 (Spain), May 2012]
 KBS Speech 100℃ [KBS1, June 2012]
 MBN News square [MBN, February 2013]
 Book club, CBS, CTS, CGV, TBS etc....

Magazine article features
 Lady Kyunghyang  [South Korea, 2011, 2013]
 Korean Daily 100℃ [South Korea, 2012],
 Woman Sense [South Korea, 2013]
 Woman's life [South Korea, 2013] etc....

Advertisement
 Public Advertisement for Election Committee  [2012]
 Radio Campaign "Wait a Minute" [MBC]
 The Korea Highway Corporation "Belt Song"

Philanthropy

Honorary ambassador 
Choi is an honorary ambassador of ChildFund Korea, the organization which helped him to improve his own life.
He said that he won't just tell the children to "have hope and dream", but he wants to help them practically by giving them a chance of a better life. He is currently assisting starving children, orphans and foster families and he is also an honorary ambassador of the Chang Dong Social Welfare Center.

Talent donation
"People who suffer have feelings that can't explain in language. And I hope my performance give consolation and uplifting to them." He does performances and speeches for the neglected classes of people – multicultural families, single moms, juvenile hall, hospice centers etc.

Support activity
He sends money or goods to those who need, with talent donation activity.

Award
 Semifinal Winner of Korea's Got Talent Season 1
 9th Candle Award by Pop Culture Critic of College Union  
 New Artist by Foreign Correspondents Club

See also 

 List of YouTube personalities
 List of South Korean television series
 List of South Korean musicians
 Television in South Korea

References

External links 
 The Official Website of Sungbong Choi

1990 births
Living people
Korea's Got Talent contestants
21st-century South Korean  male singers
South Korean baritones
South Korean tenors